The 1981 Pau Grand Prix was a Formula Two motor race held on 8 June 1981 at the Pau circuit, in Pau, Pyrénées-Atlantiques, France. The Grand Prix was won by Geoff Lees, driving the Ralt. Thierry Boutsen finished second and Piero Necchi third.

Classification

Race

References

Pau Grand Prix
1981 in French motorsport